Hexum is a surname with Scandinavian origins. It comes from the Norwegian "heksum" meaning "the home/house of the witches".  Notable people with the surname include:

 Jon-Erik Hexum (19571984), American model and actor
 Nick Hexum (born 1970), American singer, songwriter, and rapper